Santiago González and Scott Lipsky were the defending champions and successfully defended their title by defeating Pablo Cuevas and David Marrero in the final, 6–3, 3–6, [10–8].

Seeds

Draw

Draw

References
 Main draw

Men's Doubles